WY Records was a record label founded in the United States by popular reggaeton duo Wisin & Yandel.

Artists
 Wisin & Yandel
 Gadiel Veguilla

Producers & Composers
 Tainy
 Wisin & Yandel
 O'Neill
 Chris Jeday
 Jumbo El Que Produce Solo
 Ear Candy
 Hyde Quimico
 Kazanova El Arkitekto Muzikal
 Los Legendarios 
 Nely El Arma Secreta
 Nesty La Mente Maestra

Previous Artists of WY Records
Lobo
Franco el Gorila
Tony Dize
Yomile Omar El Tio
Jowell y Randy
Yaviah
Jayko
Tico el Inmigrante
Cosculluela

Previous Producers
 Nesty "La Mente Maestra"
 Victor "El Nasi"
 Marioso
 RKO

Associated Labels

 Machete Music
 Lideres Entertainment Group
 Fresh Productions
 Republic Records
 La Leyenda LLC
 Y Entertainment Records Inc
 Universal Music Group
 MultiMillo Records
 Dimelo Vi

Discography

References

External links
 Wisin Y Yandel Official Site
 Wisin y Yandel Reggaeton, Puertoricounder: Site Oficial de Wisin y Yandel Official Site
 Wisin y Yandel

Record labels established in 2005
Puerto Rican record labels
Reggaeton record labels
Vanity record labels
Labels distributed by Universal Music Group